The Channel Company is an American provider of IT channel-focused events, media, research, consulting, and sales and marketing services. The channel includes high-tech suppliers and solution providers (technology resellers).

The Channel Company's portfolio includes: media (CRN magazine), events (XChange, Women of The Channel, Best of Breed, Midsize Enterprise Summit, and NexGen conferences), tele-recruiting, sales support, managed marketing services, research and consulting (Institute for Partner Education & Development)

The Channel Company was founded by CMP Media and the division did business under the name the CMP Channel Group. When CMP was acquired by United Business Media, the company was renamed UBM Channel. The company was bought by its managers in 2013.

2007 proforma revenues for UBM Channel were $73 million.

References

External links
 

Companies based in Massachusetts
Marketing companies established in 2008
2008 establishments in Massachusetts